The College of Southern Nevada (CSN) is a public community college in Clark County, Nevada. The college has more than 2,500 teaching and non-teaching staff and is the largest public college or university in Nevada. It is part of the Nevada System of Higher Education.

History
Founded in 1971 as Clark County Community College, the school became Community College of Southern Nevada in 1991.  On March 16, 2007, the Board of Regents of the Nevada System of Higher Education voted to change the name of the school to its current name College of Southern Nevada on July 1, 2007.

Campuses
College of Southern Nevada has three main campuses in the Las Vegas Valley: the Charleston Campus, North Las Vegas Campus and Henderson Campus. There are also eight learning centers: Moapa Valley, Summerlin, Mesquite, Green Valley, Western, Sahara West, Las Vegas City Hall and Nellis Air Force Base.

Organization and administration 
The current president of CSN is Dr. Frederico Zaragoza.

Academics 
CSN provides job training in more than 70 academic programs with more than 180 degrees certificates available. The college also offers seven bachelor's degrees. The majority of students, 73.5 percent or 25,301, attend part-time and 26.5 percent or 9,108 students attend full-time.

CSN's undergraduate degrees have received regional accreditation from Northwest Commission on Colleges and Universities since 1975.

Schools and departments
 School of Advanced and Applied Technologies 
Department of Computing and Information Technology; Department of Media Technologies and Department of Applied Technologies
 School of Arts and Letters 
Department of Communications; Department of English; Department of Fine Arts; Department of International Languages and Performing Arts Center
 School of Business, Hospitality and Public Services 
Department of Accounting, Finance, Computer Office Technology; Department of Business Administration; Paralegal Studies; Department of Hospitality Management; Department of Public Safety and Human Services; Police Academy and Fire Technologies
 School of Education, Behavioral and Social Sciences 
Department of Education; Department of Human Behavior and Department of Social Sciences
Ralph & Betty Engelstad School of Health Sciences 
Department of Dental Science, Diagnostic Evaluation and Rehabilitation Services; Department of Health Related Professions and Department of Nursing
 School of Science and Mathematics 
Department of Biological Sciences; Department of Mathematics and Department of Physical Sciences
 Division of Workforce and Economic Development 
Adult Literacy and Language; American Heart and Healthcare Programs; Apprenticeship; Business Assessment and Consulting; Community Programs and Personal Enrichment; Construction; Education and Government; EMS; Occupational Health and Safety Programs.

Student life 
In fall 2014, 36.1 percent of students were Caucasian, 26.7 percent Hispanic, 10.3 percent Asian and 11.7 percent African American. Nationally the college enrolls students from 48 states in more than 3,000 classes each semester.

Athletics
The College of Southern Nevada Coyotes compete in the Scenic West Athletic Conference of the NJCAA's Division I.  The school currently has five athletic programs—men's baseball, men's soccer, women's softball, women's volleyball, and women's soccer. Baseball's first season was in 2000, and softball began its first season in 2004. Volleyball was added in 2014. Men and Women's Soccer started in Fall of 2016 and campus-wide improvements will be coming to all three campuses (including the Henderson Campus, where Athletics will be headquartered).

Baseball
The Coyotes baseball team was the first intercollegiate athletics program at CSN.  The Coyotes' home field, William R. Morse Stadium, is located at CSN's Henderson campus in Henderson, Nevada.

On March 18, 1999, CSN hired its first baseball coach—local legend Rodger Fairless, who coached former MLB pitchers Greg Maddux and Mike Maddux at Valley High School during the 1980s, and was more well known for coaching Green Valley High School to six consecutive Nevada state baseball championships from 1993 to 1998.  But, before Fairless would even conduct his first baseball practice at CSN, he stepped down on May 4, 1999, citing health reasons.  Fairless would be replaced by another local veteran coach, Tim Chambers, on July 8, 1999.

The Coyotes played their first-ever game on February 1, 2000, against Scottsdale Community College, and quickly grew into a perennial contender.  They joined the Scenic West Athletic Conference in 2002, quickly asserting themselves a place in the conference, becoming rivals with Dixie State College until the then Rebels moved up to NCAA Division II in 2006.  Since joining the SWAC, CSN has won six conference championships, two Region XVIII championships and two Western District championships.  Today, the Coyotes' rivals are the Western Nevada Wildcats, as they are the only two junior colleges in Nevada to have intercollegiate athletics, and also fueled by their fierce battles on the diamond.

On May 31, 2003, the Coyotes made history, defeating the heavily favored San Jacinto-North Gators 4–1 to win the 2003 National Junior College World Series in only their fourth year of existence.  It is CSN's only national championship in any sport to date.

In 2010, catcher Bryce Harper was selected first overall by the Washington Nationals in the Major League Baseball First Year Player Draft after a season in which he batted .443/.526/.987 (AVG/OBP/SLG) with 98 runs scored, 31 home runs, 98 RBIs, 20 SBs, and a 1.510 OPS, leading the team to a third-place finish at the National Junior College World Series. He was selected as an outfielder. Harper also won the Golden Spikes Award.

On June 11, 2010, just one week after the Coyotes had been eliminated from the JUCO World Series, longtime head coach Tim Chambers took the head coaching job at UNLV.  There would be no vacancy for long though, as CSN hired former Bishop Gorman High School baseball coach Chris Sheff on July 9, 2010, to carry on the legacy that Chambers built.

Sheff would become the second baseball coach in CSN history to never coach a game.  Allegations of illegal activity in the eyes of the NJCAA and parents alike came up, and on November 3, 2010, the school decided to relieve Sheff of his duties.

Six days later, on November 9, 2010, CSN hired former Green Valley High School coach Nick Garritano as its head baseball coach.  Garritano, who was Fairless' successor at Green Valley, won two state championships during his 12 years at the helm, producing a 315-118-1 record.  He played sports at Chaparral High School and was inducted into the UNLV Hall of Fame as a former place-kicker for the football team.

On May 5, 2012, the baseball clubhouse was officially named after James B. Whiteaker in a dedication ceremony that took place prior to the final baseball game of the regular season.  Today, "Building D" is now known as the James B. Whiteaker Clubhouse.

Recent highlights

2015 Coyotes Baseball was an exciting year of competition.  The Coyotes sported RHP – Phil Bickford (2015-drafted to SF Giants), SS – Tyler Brown (2015 – drafted to SF Giants), and OF-Matthew Waldren, who was a 2015 NJCAA Superior Academic-All-American.

Coyotes Athletic Programs pride themselves on maintaining very high individual and team academic standards.  Student-athletes at the College of Southern Nevada regularly attend and accomplish 17–21 credits per semester, averaging individual GPAs as high as 3.9.

Women's volleyball

Fall 2015 was the inaugural season hosting Women's Volleyball.

Men/women's soccer

The College of Southern Nevada now houses Men's and Women's Division I Soccer; their first season was Fall of 2016.

Men's soccer is Coached by Geoffrey Hawkins, Esq., Christopher Burgess, and Julian Portugal.  In their first season of competition they made their way to the 2016 NJCAA DIV. I, Men's Soccer Championship in Tyler, TX.  They were defeated by #2 ranked Monroe College.

Women's soccer adopted Head Coach Rob Dahl of Utah to lead them to victory.  Rob is a championship collegiate-level ladies soccer coach and is planning for the ladies to head for the Finals during his first year of 2017.  The ladies are mixed with local Las Vegas and Utah talents.

Men's soccer championships
Scenic West Athletic Conference: 2016

Baseball championships
Scenic West Athletic Conference: 2003, 2004, 2005, 2007, 2008, 2010, 2015
NJCAA Region XVIII: 2003, 2008, 2010, 2015
NJCAA Western District: 2003, 2010, 2015
NJCAA Junior College World Series: 2003

Softball
The Coyotes softball team debuted in the spring of 2004.  The Coyotes' home field is located at the Russell Road Recreation Complex, a park operated by the City of Henderson.  Talks are in the works to build a softball stadium on the CSN Henderson campus, adjacent to the baseball stadium, with funding being its major obstacle.

The program's first coach was Ric Grenell, who previously had coached women's soccer at CSN from 2000 to 2002 before the sport was discontinued.

After a moderate first season record of 16–30, the 2005 softball team did less well, winning only six games.  Shortly after the 2006 season began, another rough start prompted Grenell to resign, and Ysidro Jimenez took over as interim head coach.  Jimenez would become the permanent head coach at season's end, and remained the head coach until June 2011.

Under Jimenez, CSN softball enjoyed five winning seasons from 2007 to 2011, including a record 38 wins in the 2011 season.  But, after failing to win a conference or region championship, then-assistant coach and former longtime Hawaii-Hilo softball coach Callen Perreira was announced as Jimenez's replacement, and officially took over the helm on July 1, 2011.

In Spring of 2017, CSN welcomed the addition of the new Lady Coyotes Softball Complex at the Henderson Campus.  Softball also welcomed Head Coach Jim Overturf and Olympian Lori Harrigan-Mack.

Notable alumni
 Phil Bickford, drafted during MLB Round 1 San Francisco Giants
 Bryce Harper, drafted into MLB Round 1 Washington Nationals.
 Ryan Reeves, WWE professional wrestler, known as Ryback
 Jacky Rosen, United States Senator

Notes

References

External links

Official athletics website

 
Buildings and structures in Las Vegas
Education in Las Vegas
Educational institutions established in 1971
Nevada System of Higher Education
Universities and colleges accredited by the Northwest Commission on Colleges and Universities
Universities and colleges in Clark County, Nevada
NJCAA athletics
1971 establishments in Nevada
Community colleges in Nevada